The IEEE Robotics and Automation Award is a Technical Field Award of the Institute of Electrical and Electronics Engineers (IEEE) that was established by the IEEE Board of Directors in 2002.  This award is presented for contributions in the field of robotics and automation.

This award may be presented to an individual or team of up to three people.

Recipients of this award receive a bronze medal, certificate, and honorarium.

Recipients 
 2021: Tomas Lozano-Perez and Jean-Claude Latombe
 2020: Vijay Kumar
 2019: Zexiang Li and Tao Wang
 2018: Matthew T. Mason
 2017: Oussama Khatib
 2016: Raffaello D'Andrea
 2015: Rodney Allen Brooks
 2014: Shigeo Hirose
 2013: Ruzena Bajcsy
 2012: Bernard Roth
 2011: Hirochika Inoue
 2010: Toshio Fukuda
 2009: Antal Bejczy
 2008: Paul G. Backes
 2008: Larry H. Matthies
 2008: Eric T. Baumgartner
 2007: Gerd Hirzinger
 2006: George A. Bekey
 2005: Seiuemon Inaba
 2004: Joseph F. Engelberger

References

External links 
IEEE Robotics and Automation Award page at IEEE
List of recipients of the IEEE Robotics and Automation Award

Robotics and Automation Award
Robotics events